Moral Man and Immoral Society: A Study in Ethics and Politics is a 1932 book by Reinhold Niebuhr, an American Protestant theologian at Union Theological Seminary (UTS) in New York City. The thesis of the book is that people are more likely to sin as members of groups than as individuals. Niebuhr wrote the book in a single summer. He drew the book's contents from his experiences as a pastor in Detroit, Michigan prior to his professorship at UTS. The book attacks liberalism, both secular and religious, and is particularly critical of John Dewey and the Social Gospel. Moral Man and Immoral Society generated much controversy and raised Niebuhr's public profile significantly. Initial reception of the book by liberal Christian critics was negative, but its reputation soon improved as the rise of fascism throughout the 1930s was seen as having been predicted in the book. Soon after the book's publication, Paul Lehmann gave a copy to Dietrich Bonhoeffer, who read it and was impressed by the book's thesis but disliked the book's critique of pacifism. The book eventually gained significant readership among American Jews because, after a period of considerable anti-theological sentiment among Jews in the United States, many Jews began to return to the study of theology and, having no Jewish works of theology to read, turned to Protestant theological works.

See also
Groupthink

References

Notes

Bibliography

 
 
 
 
 
 
 
 
 
 

1932 non-fiction books
Works by Reinhold Niebuhr
Ethics books
Christian theology books
Christian hamartiology
Patriotism
Christian theology and politics
Anti-fascist books
American political books
Protestant theology
Books about liberalism
Charles Scribner's Sons books